Sir Charles Edwin Bourne Hanson, 2nd Baronet (1874-1958) was British Army officer and stockbroker who was High Sheriff of Cornwall in 1936.

His father was Sir Charles Augustin Hanson, who was Lord Mayor of London in 1917-18. 

Hanson was an officer in the 3rd The Duke of Wellington's (West Riding Regiment), a (Militia) Battalion stationed in Halifax, Yorkshire. The battalion was embodied for service in January 1900 during the Second Boer War, and Hanson left to join the fight in South Africa on the SS Bavarian two months later. He was promoted to major on 16 August 1900.

References

1874 births
1958 deaths
Baronets in the Baronetage of the United Kingdom
Alumni of Clare College, Cambridge
People from Fowey
High Sheriffs of Cornwall
Duke of Wellington's Regiment officers
British Militia officers
British Army personnel of the Second Boer War